Elijah Stephens also spelled Elisha Stevens was a blacksmith and trapper who was born in South Carolina. In 1844, he left Council Bluffs, Iowa as the captain of the Stephens-Townsend-Murphy Party, the first wagon train to cross the Sierra Nevada mountains into Alta California. He then moved to Cupertino, California, in 1848. Stevens Creek (then called Cupertino Creek) is named after him.

In 1862, Stephens left the area, heading to Kern County in central California. A state historic plaque in that city marks the approximate site of his homestead. Stephens died in Bakersfield, California in 1887. He was buried in Union Cemetery. His gravesite was discovered in 2009 by members of the Kern County Genealogical Society. On May 1, 2010, the Oregon-California Trails Association (OCTA) California/Nevada Chapter in cooperation with the Kern County Historical Society (KCHS) installed a historical plaque at the gravesite of Elijah Stephens.

California Historical Landmark

The Site of the home of Elisha Stevens' is a California Historical Landmark number .  The site is located at the corner of West Columbus and Isla Verde Street in Bakersfield, California. The site became a California State Historical Landmark No. 732 on April 8, 1960.

 California State Historical Landmark reads:
NO. 732 SITE OF THE HOME OF ELISHA STEVENS - Near this spot stood the last home of Elisha Stevens, noted American pathfinder and scout. Born in Georgia April 5, 1804, he learned blacksmithing during his youth - then, drifting west, he became a trapper on the upper Missouri for more than two decades. In 1844, he led the 50-member Murphy-Townsend wagon train safely from Council Bluffs, Iowa to Sutter's Fort. During the Mexican War he served as an ordnance mechanic under Commodore Stockton. For a time he lived in Santa Clara County, then settled here on a 38-acre tract, the first permanent settler in the Bakersfield district. He died September 9, 1887, and is buried in Union Cemetery.

See also
California Historical Landmarks in Kern County
California Historical Landmark

References

People from South Carolina
American blacksmiths
People from Cupertino, California
Stephens–Townsend–Murphy Party
1804 births
1887 deaths